SİPER (Turkish for  "trench") is a long-range surface-to-air missile (SAM) system, designed to defend against any type of airborne threat. It was jointly developed by the companies Roketsan, Aselsan and theresearch institute TÜBİTAK SAGE in Turkey.

The SİPER system project was launched by the Defence Industries Presidency in 2018. The missile is developed by Roketsan and the most sensors and electronics by Aselsan. İt is capable of fighting aircraft, cruise missiles, air-to-ground missiles and unmanned aerial vehicle (UAV). The Siper is expected to rival Russia's S-400 missile system.

During the first firing test, which took place at the test range in Sinop, northern Turkey end December 2022, the SİPER Block 1 missile  successfully demonstrated the ability to detect, track and hit a high-speed target aircraft at a range exceeding . It was announced that SİPER will be put into service within 2023

References 

Surface-to-air missiles of Turkey
21st-century surface-to-air missiles
Weapons and ammunition introduced in 2022
Military equipment introduced in the 2020s
Roketsan products
Aselsan products